U.S. Route 64 (US-64) is a U.S. highway running from the Four Corners area to the Outer Banks of North Carolina. US-64 enters the state from New Mexico, crossing the line between the two states between Clayton, New Mexico, and Boise City in Cimarron County. The route runs the full length of the Oklahoma Panhandle, then serves the northernmost tier of counties in the main body of the state before dipping southeastward to Tulsa, the state's second-largest city. From Tulsa, the highway continues southeast, leaving Oklahoma just west of Fort Smith, Arkansas. In addition to Tulsa, US-64 serves fifteen Oklahoma counties and the cities of Guymon, Woodward, Enid, and Muskogee.

US-64 has been a part of the United States Numbered Highways system from the program's inception in 1926. US-64's route has remained roughly the same since then, although it has undergone alterations several times, many changing its course through towns and moving the highway designation to higher-capacity expressways and freeways.

Route description

The Panhandle

U.S. Route 64 crosses the New Mexico–Oklahoma state line northeast of Clayton, New Mexico, concurrent with US-56 and US-412. The three highways enter the state just north of the extreme southwest corner of Cimarron County, the westernmost tip of the Oklahoma Panhandle. The highways head northeast, passing through disconnected parcels of the Rita Blanca National Grassland. The first town US-56, US-64, and US-412 encounter in Oklahoma is unincorporated Felt, of which they skirt the northern edge. The highways then cross the Beaver River before intersecting US-385, which joins the other three highways in a concurrency as they approach Boise City, the county seat. In Boise City, the highways reach a traffic circle which surrounds the Cimarron County Courthouse. At this traffic circle, US-56, US-64, and US-412 all turn east, while US-385 splits away to the north. State Highway 3 (SH-3) enters the circle from the north and leaves from the east, following US-64, while SH-325 begins at the circle and heads west toward Kenton. East of town, US-56/US-64/US-412/SH-3 have an interchange with US-287, which bypasses Boise City to the east.  northeast of here, US-56 splits away from the other highways; it continues northeast, while US-64/US-412/SH-3 turn onto a due east course.

The four highways cross the Beaver River once again before entering that city, Texas County's seat and the largest city in the Panhandle, on Main Street. In Guymon, US-64 splits away to the east along NE 12th Street, while US-412 and state highways 3 and 136 continue south. US-64 is accompanied on 12th Street by truck routes for the latter three highways. At the intersection with US-54, the truck routes turn southwest, while US-64 turns northeast, following US-54 out of town US-54/US-64 continue northeast through eastern Texas County, running parallel to a Union Pacific rail line. After crossing the Beaver River (the only crossing for US-54, but the third for US-64), the highways cut through the northwest corner of the town of Optima. Continuing northeast, US-54 and US-64 run just southeast of Panoma before coming to Hooker. There, US-54/US-64 serve as the northern terminus of SH-94. After the SH-94 junction, US-54 continues northeast toward Tyrone and Liberal, Kansas, while US-64 splits off onto a due east course. The road passes south of Baker before leaving Texas County.

Next, US-64 passes through Beaver County, the easternmost of the three counties forming the Oklahoma Panhandle. US-83 and westbound US-270 continue north from this junction toward Liberal, while US-64 and US-270 eastbound form a concurrency heading due east. Passing north of Floris, the highways proceed east for about  without any curves or junctions with other highways before reaching Forgan. East of Forgan lies a highway junction with SH-23—here, US-270 splits away from US-64, turning south along SH-23 en route to the county seat, Beaver. SH-23 joins US-64 to form a  concurrency before also splitting away toward its northern terminus at the Kansas line. US-64 does not intersect any other highways in the  segment of highway in Beaver County east of the SH-23 junction. As it zig-zags southeastward, the highway passes through the towns of Knowles and Gate.  east of Gate, the highway crosses the Beaver–Harper county line, the eastern boundary of the Oklahoma Pandhandle, and enters the main body of the state.

Northern Oklahoma
The two highways pass through Rosston, then US-283 splits away to the south toward Laverne. US-64 continues alone on a due east course for  before reaching the northern terminus of SH-46. The highway continues east, then veers northeast, and turns back to the east before meeting up with US-183 on the south side of Buffalo, the county seat. US-64 turns north at this intersection, overlapping US-183 through town. The two routes part ways northeast of town, with US-183 continuing on a northerly course toward Kansas and US-64 turning east once again. On the east end of the county, US-64 begins another concurrency, this time with SH-34.

As US-64 and SH-34 cross the Cimarron River, the two highways enter Woods County. SH-34 splits off to the north shortly thereafter. US-64 continues on east, passing through unincorporated Plainview and turning southeast to intersect SH-50 at its northern terminus at Camp Houston, north of Freedom. The two highways proceed into the Woods County seat, Alva, where they join US-281. This concurrency lasts about  before US-281 splits off to the north on the east side of town; at this point, SH-14 ends. US-64 continues east by itself for  before reaching the eastern limit of Woods County.

The next county that US-64 serves on its path across Oklahoma is Alfalfa County. After passing  through rural Alfalfa county, it approaches the unincorporated Ingersoll, whereupon it continues another  until the route intersects state highways 8, 11, and 58. All three of these highways extend north from the intersection, while SH-11 continues east. US-64 turns south at this intersection, overlapping SH-8 and SH-58. They then pass through Cherokee, seat of Alfalfa County. US-64 proceeds east to Jet, where it forms the southern terminus of SH-38. Four miles west of Jet,  the highway exits Alfalfa County.

Upon leaving Alfalfa County, US-64 passes into Grant County. The first town the highway passes through in Grant County is Nash, where it begins a concurrency with SH-132. This concurrency lasts for  before SH-132 splits away.  east of this junction, US-64 intersects US-60 and US-81 in a T junction. US-81 northbound and US-60 eastbound continue straight, while US-64 eastbound turns south along with southbound US-81 and westbound US-60 (creating a wrong-way concurrency with US-60). The three highways continue south into Garfield County.  south of the T junction, US-60 / US-64 / US-81 serve as the eastern terminus of SH-45. This junction marks the highways' entry into the Enid area. The highways serve as the city limit boundary between Enid (to the west) and North Enid (to the east). US-64 heads south from the interchange on North 4th Street. At Willow Road, US-64 turns due east; it follows Willow Road for about  before turning south on North 30th Street. This street has a parclo interchange with Owen K. Garriott Road, which carries US-412; here, US-64 joins US-412, and the two highways head due east out of Enid as a four-lane expressway. East of Enid, the two routes pass between Breckenridge and Fairmont. South of Garber lies an interchange between US-64 / US-412 and SH-74. SH-15 also begins here, extending north along SH-74. US-64 / US-412 continue east out of Garfield County.

US-64 and US-412 next enter Noble County. The two highways' first junction with another highway in the county is a cloverleaf interchange at I-35 (exit 194 on the interstate). US-412 continues straight through the interchange, forming the Cimarron Turnpike, while US-64 follows I-35 southbound. US-64 splits away from the interstate in Perry at exit 186, heading due east, deeper into Perry. US-64 continues east out of Perry. West of Morrison, the highway crosses US-177. US-64 then passes through Morrison. East of town, US-64 has an interchange with the Cimarron Turnpike, still carrying US-412, at turnpike exit 22. US-64 continues northeast to Lela, where it serves as the northern terminus of SH-108, which runs along the Noble–Pawnee county line. US-64 continues east into Pawnee County.

About  into Pawnee County, US-64 enters the county seat, Pawnee. Here, the route begins a concurrency with SH-18. The two highways head southeast out of town together for just over  before SH-18 splits off to the south toward Lone Chimney. US-64 continues alone to the east for about  before beginning another concurrency, this time with SH-99, on the outskirts of Cleveland. The two highways leave Cleveland, proceeding east through unincorporated territory, before re-entering the city. Here, the two highways head in separate directions, with SH-99 heading north and US-64 heading southeast. This portion of the highway runs parallel to Keystone Lake, a reservoir formed by the impounded Arkansas River. US-64 intersects with SH-48 at the latter's northern terminus before merging with US-412 in a partial interchange (the missing movements are provided via SH-48). This interchange is also the Cimarron Turnpike's eastern endpoint.

Tulsa area
US-64 / US-412 continue east from the eastern terminus of the Cimarron Turnpike in southeastern Pawnee as a freeway known as the Keystone Expressway. This highway continues eastward along a peninsula into Lake Keystone. Here, the highway serves as the southern limit of Westport and Mule Barn, which remains an incorporated town despite having a population of zero. The freeway turns southeast, briefly entering Westport before crossing Lake Keystone into Osage County. US-64 and US-412 run through Osage County for just under , cutting across a corner of the county before entering Tulsa County.

Upon entering Tulsa County, US-64 / US-412 serve as the northern terminus of SH-151. The freeway passes through an outlying parcel of Sand Springs, running parallel to the Arkansas River, before emerging into unincorporated territory. Proceeding east, the freeways re-enter Sand Springs, passing through an interchange with SH-97 just south of downtown. SH-51 joins the Keystone Expressway at this interchange. The freeway then enters Tulsa (estimated population 394,098 ), the second-largest city in Oklahoma. The Keystone Expressway continues to an interchange at the northwest corner of the Inner Dispersal Loop (IDL), a ring of freeways encircling downtown Tulsa. At this interchange, US-64 meets I-244 and the L.L. Tisdale Parkway. US-412 follows I-244 east, while US-64 and SH-51 turn south along I-244 westbound. The three highways then run along the western side of the IDL. At the southwest corner of the loop lies an interchange serving as the western terminus of unsigned I-444. US-64 and SH-51 split away from I-244 at this interchange to join I-444 and US-75. I-444, US-64, US-75, and SH-51 head east along the south leg of the IDL. At the southeast corner of the IDL, the highways part ways; I-444 and US-75 turn north along the east side of the IDL, while US-64 and SH-51 split off to the east.

US-64 and SH-51 proceed southeast from downtown along another freeway, the Broken Arrow Expressway. Between Lewis Avenue and Sheridan Road, a rail line runs down the median of the highway. After the freeway splits away from the railroad alignment, it comes to an interchange with I-44 / SH-66. From here, the Broken Arrow Expressway heads southeast to an interchange with the Mingo Valley Expressway, which carries US-169. Here, US-64 splits away to follow the southbound Mingo Valley Expressway, while SH-51 continues southeast on the Broken Arrow Expressway. US-64 / US-169 follow a due south course to an interchange with the Creek Turnpike. The freeway merges with a free section of the turnpike, heading west. At an interchange with Memorial Drive, US-64 turns south, splitting away from the freeway. US-169 ends at this point, and tolls resume on the Creek Turnpike to the west of the interchange.

From here, US-64 proceeds south on Memorial Drive into Bixby. In Bixby, the highway crosses the Arkansas River for the second time. Further south, it serves as the eastern terminus of SH-67. On the southern outskirts of Bixby, it turns east, passing through unincorporated Leonard before exiting Tulsa County.

Eastern Oklahoma
Southeast of Leonard, US-64 cuts across extreme southwestern Wagoner County, passing through Stone Bluff, before entering Muskogee County. US-64 and SH-72 head south from Haskell, passing through unincorporated Jamesville and coming to a junction south of the settlement. Here, SH-72 splits away from US-64, continuing a southbound course straight through the junction to join westbound US-62. The western leg of this junction leads to westbound SH-16. US-64 turns to the east, joined by eastbound US-62 and SH-16. The three routes serve as the southern terminus of SH-162, a spur route to Taft. The road forms a gentle S-curve as it comes into the city of Muskogee, the county seat. Here, the routes split ways at an intersection with US-69; US-62 ad SH-16 turn north along US-69, while US-64 follows southbound US-69. US-62 BUS / US-64 BUS continue east from the intersection. US-64 / US-69 continue south to an intersection with Peak Boulevard, where US-64 heads east on its own. US-64 proceeds south for just under  to Warner, where it forms the eastern terminus of US-266 and the northern terminus of SH-2. US-64 turns back to the east here, running parallel to I-40 between Warner and Webbers Falls, where it has an interchange with the Muskogee Turnpike. East of the turnpike interchange, US-64 begins a concurrency with SH-100. The two highways pass northwest of downtown Webbers Falls before crossing the Arkansas River, which forms the boundary of Muskogee County, a third time.

The final county US-64 passes through on its trek through Oklahoma is Sequoyah County, where much of its path loosely follows that of I-40. At this same intersection, US-64 is joined by SH-10, which follows it out of Gore before splitting off southeast of town. US-64 continues alone to the town of Vian, where it intersects SH-82. East of Vian, US-64 serves the county seat, Sallisaw, where it overlaps US-59. On the southeast side of the city, it comes to an interchange with I-40 (exit 311 from the Interstate). US-64 heast southeast from Sallisaw, turning back to the east at the eastern terminus of SH-141. It crosses under I-40 just east of here, although there are no ramps between the two roads. US-64 then enters Muldrow. Here, the highway intersects SH-64B. US-64 then continues into Roland, where another interchange with I-40 (exit 325) is located. The highway then turns southeast, passing north of Moffett, with two interchanges serving SH-64D, which heads north to Dora, Arkansas, and Grand Boulevard, which heads south into Moffett. US-64 then crosses the Arkansas River a fourth time, the final crossing in Oklahoma; the river's east bank is the Oklahoma–Arkansas state line.

History
US-64 was one of the original United States Numbered Highways designated at the highway system's creation on November 11, 1926. It stretched from the New Mexico state line in the Oklahoma panhandle east to the Arkansas state line near Fort Smith. The original route included two sharp, right-angle turns near the city of Freedom. On February 19, 1934, the Oklahoma Highway Commission approved the re-routing of US-64 onto a roadway a bit further west to eliminate these turns. On November 9, 1937, the highway was re-routed through the city of Tulsa, as well. Later, in 1943 just south of the city of Muskogee, US-64 and SH-2, which was then concurrent with US-64, were relocated slightly to the west to allow for the new Davis Field air base to be constructed at the place the highways had run before relocation.

On July 7, 1947, another modification to the route was made, moving its western terminus from the northern portion of the panhandle to a new roadway in the southern section. The next significant change to the highway took place on April 4, 1960, when it was realigned to the north between the cities of Gore and Vian. Two years later, on April 4, 1962, US-64 was relocated to the north west of Tulsa, near Sand Springs. On November 4, 1963, a bypass was added through the city of Enid. It was designated as US-64 Bypass and ran on Willow Avenue and 30th Street. A couple of months later, on February 3, 1964, US-64 was moved onto a freeway through the southeastern portion of Tulsa. Later, on December 1 of the same year, similar reroutings through Tulsa and Broken Arrow were approved by the Oklahoma Department of Highways.

The routing of US-64 was modified further on July 6, 1965, through the city of Enid. The routing of US-64 Bypass, which was designated two years earlier, was replaced by that of US-64 itself, and what used to be US-64 became part of a new business loop (US-64 Bus.) through the city. The Oklahoma Department of Highways approved a rerouting of the designation onto a freeway south of Muskogee on October 3, 1966, and a relocation slightly to the north between Jamesville and Muskogee on July 10, 1967. However, neither of these modifications was completed until around 1969. Then, on June 1, 1970, US-64 was relocated across the Arkansas River between Webber Falls and Gore. Between then and 1972, US-64 was realigned between Enid and Perry, with the old highway becoming SH-164.

By 1974, the majority of the freeway that US-64 was to occupy in Tulsa was complete, and it was relocated onto the completed portion of the freeway. Only the portion in the downtown section of the city was yet to be completed. The remainder of the freeway, the concurrency with Interstate 444, was not completed until about 1983. The next and final major modification to the designation of US-64 took place when it was moved from its route through eastern Tulsa onto the newly constructed Creek Turnpike over the first half of 1992. The route has undergone only minor changes since then.

The section of US-64 between Webbers Falls and Gore was pressed into service as a detour for I-40 traffic after the collapse of its bridge over the Arkansas River on May 26, 2002. The detour significantly impacted the town of Gore. Local firefighters directed traffic there 24 hours a day, with daytime temperatures approaching . Businesses in Gore reported loss of revenue due to the traffic; one gas station reported a 30% decline in revenue while traffic was detoured through town. Delays of thirty to fifty minutes on the  detour were typical, although trains passing through Gore could lengthen wait times by 15 minutes.

Major intersections

Spur routes
Near the east end of its route through Oklahoma, US-64 currently connects to two short highways, bearing the number "64" with a letter suffix, branching off from the interstate to connect the highway to other roads. Both of these highways lie entirely within Sequoyah County and connect US-64 to I-40.

In the past, US-64 also connected to a short spur highway in Perry.

SH-64A

SH-64A first appeared on the official state highway map in 1965, though it was not labeled as SH-64A until the 1966 edition.

When US-64 was realigned around 1971, US-64 was realigned to follow SH-64A through Perry. The SH-64A designation was retired at this time.

SH-64B

From here, the highway continues north along Main Street through downtown Muldrow. After passing through downtown, SH-64B leaves the city limits and proceeds north to unincorporated Long. North of Long, it comes to its northern terminus at SH-101.

SH-64B first appeared on the 1959 state highway map as a gravel highway. By 1962, the southern half of the highway had been paved. The remainder of the highway was paved by the following year.

SH-64C

State Highway 64C was a short state highway in Sequoyah County that existed briefly in the early 1970s. SH-64C began at SH-64B north of Muldrow. From here, it proceeded southeast in a stairstep fashion, using a mix of gravel and paved roads, to Roland. From Roland, it continued south, crossing I-40 and coming to its eastern terminus at US-64.

SH-64C first appeared on the 1974 state highway map. It had been removed from the state highway system in its entirety by 1976.

SH-64D

State Highway 64D is a highway beginning at US-64 in Moffett, running parallel to the Oklahoma–Arkansas state line to its northern terminus at I-40 exit 330 just west of Dora, Arkansas.

SH-64D first appeared on the 1974 state map. At that time, the highway had a gravel road surface. By the next year, it had been paved in its entirety.

References

External links

US-64 at OKHighways

 Oklahoma
64
Transportation in Cimarron County, Oklahoma
Transportation in Texas County, Oklahoma
Transportation in Beaver County, Oklahoma
Transportation in Harper County, Oklahoma
Transportation in Woods County, Oklahoma
Transportation in Alfalfa County, Oklahoma
Transportation in Grant County, Oklahoma
Transportation in Garfield County, Oklahoma
Transportation in Noble County, Oklahoma
Transportation in Pawnee County, Oklahoma
Transportation in Osage County, Oklahoma
Transportation in Tulsa, Oklahoma
Transportation in Tulsa County, Oklahoma
Transportation in Wagoner County, Oklahoma
Transportation in Muskogee County, Oklahoma
Transportation in Sequoyah County, Oklahoma